Rhythm Heaven Megamix, known in Europe and Australia as Rhythm Paradise Megamix, and in Japan as  and Rhythm World: The Best Plus in Korea, is a rhythm game developed and published by Nintendo for the Nintendo 3DS. It is the fourth game in Nintendo's Rhythm Heaven series and compiles stages from the series' previous entries; Rhythm Tengoku, Rhythm Heaven, and Rhythm Heaven Fever, as well as adding new ones. The game was released in Japan in June 2015 and in North America, Europe, Oceania. and South Korea throughout 2016.

Gameplay

Like the previous three entries in the series, Rhythm Heaven Megamix is composed of several Rhythm Games, requiring players to play in time with the music in order to clear each one. The game uses the traditional control scheme featured in the original Rhythm Tengoku, which uses the A, B, and directional buttons on the Nintendo 3DS. The game can be optionally played with the stylus, though controls are more simplified compared to Rhythm Heaven. The game features over 100 Rhythm Games, including 70 taken from previous titles (including the GBA release, which was never released outside of Japan) and 30 brand new ones, as well as new Remix stages based on the game's Rainbow Towers which combine the previous rhythm games in the tower (or more rhythm games) into one song. Tower-themed elements are incorporated into the remix while every character in the present rhythm games get to wear special tower-themed alternate costumes (except for the Left-Hand, Right-Hand and Final Remixes). Ratings for the Rhythm Games are now awarded based on a score meter indicating how well the player performed. Each Rhythm Game also features a special Skill Star point, which awards bonuses for hitting a certain part of the game with precise timing. Playing through Rhythm Games earns Medals that can be used to unlock bonuses such as additional rhythm games.

Megamix features a Story Mode in which players try to help a character named Tibby reach Heaven World, his home. The mode has players play through stages in a linear format (where they are grouped into Stages of four; one from Rhythm Tengoku, one from Rhythm Heaven, one from Rhythm Heaven Fever, and one new), which is broken up by challenge games, before allowing players to tackle various towers in any order they choose. Some older Rhythm Games that returned in Megamix (such as Karate Man, Glee Club, Shoot-'em-up, Figure Fighter and Air Rally), received a prequel version, an easier version which takes the original name and description of each game, and has new graphics and an alternated music (to match the music style of the new rhythm games featured in Megamix), while the actual original Rhythm Games have been labeled as sequels and are given new names. An outlier to this is Figure Fighter 3, which is a port of Figure Fighter's sequel from Rhythm Heaven Fever, Figure Fighter 2, not to be confused with Megamix Figure Fighter 2, which is Fever Figure Fighter 1.

Some of the returning games from Tengoku and Heaven (DS) have been added new music and redesigned graphics. Outside of the Story Mode, players can attempt Perfect Campaigns, which require players to clear selected stages without making any mistakes, or take on challenges on the Challenge Train, which can be played with up to four players via Download Play. The Challenge Mode in the game also has two WarioWare crossover challenges named as "Wario... Where?", which replaces some of the rhythm games' main characters with characters from the WarioWare series. This is due to both the WarioWare and Rhythm Heaven franchises being made by the same developers. The game also features bonus rhythm games, all of which are from previous titles, and a Figure Fighter Duel challenge that uses the 3DS' StreetPass functionality.

Plot 
Tibby, a citizen of Heaven World, fell into the sky into a forest at the beginning of the game. With the help of the player, the two clear several worlds, meeting several people along the way. At the Lush Tower, the game-play style slightly changes, as Remixes are added. The first fake-out scene happens after Lush Remix is cleared, where Tibby was supposed to go back to Heaven World, but falls and hits his head before he can reach Heaven World. Several Towers appear, each containing either sequels of the games the player has played before, or entirely new games. After the player clears all 6 of the extra worlds, the second fake-out scene occurs, with Tibby being sent back up to Heaven World, but upon arrival, the place is "gloomy". Upon clearing several more game sets, they come upon the final 3 towers. Left-hand Tower, Right-Hand Tower, and Tibby's Mom. (The species of which Tibby belongs to become houses as they grow up.) The player clears the games in each of the 3 towers, before Heaven World returns to normal. It had become changed because Tibby's Mom had held her breath, due to her getting hiccups. The game shortly ends thereafter, however the player can still play the game if he or she still chooses to.

Development
Masami Yone, the director of Rhythm Heaven Fever, assumed the same role for Megamix. He was assisted by Takumi Hatakeyama, who previously worked as a programmer and designer for WarioWare D.I.Y. and Rhythm Heaven Fever. Ko Takeuchi returns as the art director, and Yoshio Sakamoto as the general producer. The game was first announced near the end of a Japanese Nintendo Direct on January 14, 2015 in Japan, when Satoru Iwata is seen involved in a Nintendo Direct take of Karate Man Returns, before the gameplay footage is shown. More gameplay footage was shown in the Japanese April 1 Nintendo Direct.

The game's music is done by Tsunku♂ (who also serves as the game's producer), as well as Shinji Ushiroda, Asuka Ito, Yumi Takahashi, and Megumi Inoue. While some music pieces from the original Rhythm Tengoku and Rhythm Heaven (DS) were re-used, Rhythm Heaven Megamix re-uses several music themes from the previous game, Rhythm Heaven Fever. For the prequel versions of older rhythm games from previous titles and for the new rhythm games and remixes in the game, most of the music that Tsunku♂ had composed for them was given a techno-themed motif. This is different from the music styles used in the previous three Rhythm Heaven titles, which in Rhythm Tengoku, Rhythm Heaven (DS), and Rhythm Heaven Fever, the music for those titles was a mix of catchy tunes and vocal songs. In a Iwata Asks interview, Satoru Iwata said; "Making music for the game was difficult, but that's what it was like". Tsunku♂ said; "As with music, to compete with the original work... It's very tricky, but while leaving the theme, the newly created Prequels. In making music for the games (the prequel of Karate Man for example), I'd have a strong feeling for it because it was unexpectedly tough. I am very particular about the game, but no matter how many times I submit a music piece, it doesn't look right... If you make one at Nintendo's request while thinking, some think; The image is a little different, though. The piece for Karate Man submitted for the second time. It was a minor in changes and the guitar was fierce, it's so intense that it's cool! Not the game of the same name that appears in the beginning, though. It is used by those who appear in the final game".

In addition to using vocal songs from previous entries, newly written songs for the game were being made. Tsunku♂ commented; "We have selected people who are suitable for singing fresh songs in the game". The four new vocal songs for Megamix are "Tokimeki no Monogatari" (used for the Lush Remix), "I'm a lady now/Hotzmic" (used for the Honeybee Remix), "For That One Big Tear" (used for the Machine Remix), and "Classmate" (used for the game's Staff Roll). For "Tokimeki no Monogatari", Tsunku♂ commented; "There is a feeling of twilight at dusk. The singers who sing this song did a great job". He brought in Tokimekist (Chi-chan, Rino Hirayama, Mai-chan, Yurinko) to record the song. For "I'm a lady now/Hotzmic", Tsunku♂ asked a person he met in New York to write the lyrics. To provide the vocals, Azuki Moeno participated, and as will be described later, Tsunku's eldest daughter, who was 6 years old at the time of recording the song, participated under the name of Hotzmic. In recording "For That One Big Tear", Tsunku♂ really liked the song's melody and lyrics, so he brought in Hikaru Ohashi, a singer from the Ishikawa prefecture, to sing. For "Classmate", Tsunku♂ said; "It's a song that you can hear if you play this game quite a bit. I had a pretty concrete image from the beginning, when I wondered what kind of game it would be. I'm surprised that this will happen... I was so moved that I almost cried. The song here is somehow sweet and sour. The feeling that I'm not so good is really good, and I think I'm addicted to it". He brought in Pajama Musume Club (Karen, Azuki Moeno, Hitomi Yoshida) to record the song. The music video for "I'm a lady now/Hotzmic" was released (probably to promote Megamix) in Japan, in which the song is extended than the 1-minute version heard in the Honeybee Remix. The video features Hotzmic singing the song while dancing in a room. "Tokimeki no Monogatari", "For That One Big Tear" and "Classmate" were replaced by instrumental versions of the three songs in the American, European, and Korean versions of the game, replacing the singing because there are no lyrics for the respective languages.

Megamix was the final game developed by Nintendo SPD1 before it was merged into Nintendo Entertainment Planning and Development. In 2016, Nintendo announced that the game would launch in North America, Europe, Australia and Korea "later" that year. The game was released as a Nintendo eShop exclusive in North America on June 15, 2016 during Nintendo's Treehouse Livestream presentation at E3 2016. The game received a physical retail release in Europe on October 21, 2016. Like the European release of Beat the Beat: Rhythm Paradise, the English versions of the game feature both English and Japanese audio.

Reception
Rhythm Heaven Megamix received favourable reviews from Famitsu reviewers, scoring 34/40 (8/8/8/10) in Famitsu Score, and praised for various aspects including its great variety in gameplay despite the simple controls, and supportive feedback from input timing effects.

The game debuted at No. 1 in Japanese charts maintained by Media Create, recording 158,000 copies sold in its first week of release. As of 26 February 2016, total Japanese sales reached 650,000 copies.

References

External links

2015 video games
Nintendo 3DS eShop games
Nintendo 3DS games
Nintendo 3DS-only games
Nintendo Network games
Multiplayer and single-player video games
Rhythm Heaven
Video games developed in Japan
Music video games